Gitau wa Njenga  1971-2021, was  a Kenyan photojournalist and politician. He moved to the UK in the 1990s and worked as London Correspondent for the East African Standard and The Nation newspapers. Gitau broke the story of the first Kenyan gay wedding in London, published by Sunday Nation in October 2009.

Early life 
He studied journalism and broadcasting at the University of Salford (BA, 2007) and photojournalism at the University of Westminster (MA, 2009).

Career 
After 18 years in the UK, Gitau returned to Nairobi in 2010 to enter elective politics.
During the 2013 general elections, he vied for the Kikuyu parliamentary seat on a TNA ticket, but lost at the nomination stage. He left TNA and joined New Democrats Party. He lost to the TNA candidate in a race with 12 candidates.

He worked in print media journalism both in Kenya and in the UK. In 2006 he launched Jambo Magazine, a full colour glossy magazine celebrating African success in the diaspora.

Recognition 
In 2004, Gitau received the Kenya Foreign Correspondent of the Year Award for special investigative reports on the murders of British tourist Julie Ward and former Kenya Foreign Minister Dr Robert Ouko, which occurred in Kenya in the 1990s.

Death
Gitau died on 28 December 2021 in Nairobi, Kenya.

References

1971 births
Living people
Kenyan journalists
Alumni of the University of Salford
Alumni of the University of Westminster
Kenyan politicians